is a Japanese model and actress. Maeda modeled exclusively for the pre-teen fashion magazine Pichi Lemon from 2006 to 2010. From 2011 to 2017, Maeda was an exclusive model for the fashion magazine Popteen. In her early television career, Maeda was known for her appearances on Oha Suta as the show's then-Oha Girl.

Career
In 2006, Maeda took part in the 14th Model Audition Grand Prix for the pre-teen fashion magazine Pichi Lemon and won, becoming an exclusive model for the magazine from May 2006 to September 2010. After graduating from Pichi Lemon, she later modeled exclusively for Popteen beginning in the March 2011 issue until 2017.

Publications

Photo books

Novels

Manga

Filmography

Music video

Television

Film

References

1993 births
21st-century Japanese actresses
Japanese female models
Japanese YouTubers
Living people